added child lit portal.

Thomas J. Dygard (August 10, 1931 - October 5, 1996) was an American author and journalist. He wrote several novels for children, relating to sports.

His best-known titles include:
Second Stringer (Football)
The Rookie Arrives (Baseball)
Outside Shooter (Basketball)
Soccer Duel (Soccer)
Wilderness Peril (Camping, hiking)

References

External links

American children's writers
American male journalists
20th-century American journalists
1931 births
1996 deaths
20th-century American non-fiction writers
20th-century American male writers